Dwight Douglas Lewis (born October 16, 1945) is a former American football linebacker in the National Football League for the Dallas Cowboys. He played college football at Mississippi State University and was drafted in the sixth round of the 1968 NFL Draft. Lewis was inducted into the College Football Hall of Fame in 2001.

Early years
Born in 1945 in Knoxville, Tennessee, Lewis was the youngest of 14 children. Lewis was named Dwight Douglas after two great generals in World War II, Dwight Eisenhower and Douglas MacArthur. He attended Fulton High School, where he was a Tennessee All-State linebacker in 1963.

College career
Lewis starred at Mississippi State University from 1965 to 1967 as a two-way player and three-year starter. He led Mississippi State in tackles and assists all three of his varsity seasons and was named team captain his senior year.

Despite being on teams that went 7–23, Lewis earned All-Southeastern Conference honors twice and was a first-team All-American selection his senior year.

Repeatedly anointed as the top linebacker in the Southeastern Conference, Lewis made a distinct impression on rival coaches. Hall of Fame coach Bear Bryant called D.D. Lewis "the best linebacker in the country". Bill Yeoman applauded Lewis' ability to recover and pursue and said he was the finest linebacker he had seen that year. Following the 1967 season, Vince Dooley said he was the best linebacker Georgia had faced – "He's terrific."

Lewis won numerous awards: SEC All-sophomore team (1965), All-SEC (1966–67), SEC defensive player of the year (1967), UPI second-team All-American (1967), outstanding athlete (1968). At the end of his senior year, Lewis was selected to play in the Senior Bowl, the Coaches All-America Game, and the Blue–Gray Game.

For his accomplishments while at Mississippi State University, Lewis was inducted into the nation's College Football Hall of Fame in 2001. In 1987, Lewis was inducted into the state of Mississippi Sports Hall of Fame. Lewis is also a member of the Mississippi State, Blue–Gray Game, Knoxville, Mississippi and Tennessee sports Hall of Fame.

Professional career
Although he was a great college player, Lewis was selected by the Dallas Cowboys in the sixth round (159th overall) of the 1968 NFL Draft, because teams thought that he was too small to play in the NFL. As a rookie at training camp, the team tried him at center, before moving him to outside linebacker.

In 1969, he spent what would have been his second season doing military service. In 1973 after serving as a backup for four seasons, Lewis took over the weakside linebacker position, when Chuck Howley retired, and held this position for nine straight years.

His best game was in the 1975 NFC Championship Game, when he intercepted two passes in a 37–7 victory against the Los Angeles Rams, helping the Cowboys become the first wild-card team to make it to the Super Bowl.

To this day, he holds the Cowboys playoff record with 27 games played. During his NFL career, Lewis played in 12 NFC divisional-round contests, one NFC wild-card contest and nine NFC Championship Games. He made five Super Bowl appearances while winning Super Bowl VI and Super Bowl XII. During the 1980 season, he became along with Larry Cole, the first three-decade players in franchise history.

Lewis played for 13 years and started 135 consecutive games (third in team history), until his retirement after the 1981 season. He was voted the "Most Popular Player" by the Cowboys fans and given the Bart Starr Meritorious Award in 1981. He is one of only eight NFL players who have played in five Super Bowls: (V, VI, X, XII and XIII).

During the 1982 season, Lewis famously reasoned that "Texas Stadium has a hole in its roof so God can watch His favorite team play".

Although he was never selected to a Pro Bowl or All-Pro squad, he served as defensive co-captain in 1977 and 1978. In 1984, he was named to the Cowboys Silver Anniversary Team.

References

External links
 

1945 births
Living people
American football linebackers
Dallas Cowboys players
Mississippi State Bulldogs football players
College Football Hall of Fame inductees
Players of American football from Knoxville, Tennessee